The following lists events that happened during 1971 in Australia.

Incumbents

Monarch – Elizabeth II
Governor-General – Sir Paul Hasluck
Prime Minister –  John Gorton (until 10 March), then William McMahon
Deputy Prime Minister – John McEwen (until 5 February), then Doug Anthony
Opposition Leader –  Gough Whitlam
Chief Justice – Sir Garfield Barwick

State and Territory Leaders
Premier of New South Wales – Robert Askin
Opposition Leader – Pat Hills
Premier of Queensland – Joh Bjelke-Petersen
Opposition Leader – Jack Houston
Premier of South Australia – Don Dunstan
Opposition Leader – Steele Hall
Premier of Tasmania – Angus Bethune
Opposition Leader – Eric Reece
Premier of Victoria – Sir Henry Bolte
Opposition Leader – Clyde Holding
Premier of Western Australia – Sir David Brand (until 3 March), then John Tonkin
Opposition Leader – John Tonkin (until 3 March), then Sir David Brand

Governors and Administrators
Governor of New South Wales – Sir Roden Cutler
Governor of Queensland – Sir Alan Mansfield
Governor of South Australia – Major General Sir James William Harrison (until 16 September), then Sir Mark Oliphant (from 1 December)
Governor of Tasmania – Lieutenant General Sir Edric Bastyan
Governor of Victoria – Major General Sir Rohan Delacombe
Governor of Western Australia – Major General Sir Douglas Kendrew
Administrator of Norfolk Island – Robert Dalkin
Administrator of the Northern Territory – Frederick Chaney
Administrator of Papua and New Guinea – Les Johnson

Events
 Neville Bonner becomes first Indigenous Australian to sit as a member in the Parliament of Australia
 Evonne Goolagong is named Australian of the Year.

January
3 January - 
Sudden hailstorms lash the Sydney area causing widespread damage to houses and properties, as well as traffic chaos and nearly $150,000 worth of damage to fruit and vegetable crops at Cobbity.
New South Wales Transport Minister announces that intensified police weekend patrols might become a regular part of the campaign to cut the road toll after 8,148 New South Wales motorists were arrested or charged over the New Year holiday weekend.
4 January - 
Federal Opposition Leader Gough Whitlam says in Port Moresby that Papuan leaders seem to accept completely the Australian Labor Party's timetable for independence of Papua New Guinea. The timetable provides for self-government as soon as a Labor Government comes to power in Australia, and independence in 1976.
Immigration Minister Phillip Lynch gives a ruling that three Asian doctors at St Vincent's Hospital Sydney, who entered Australia under the private overseas student program, will be sent home, but may apply to return to Australia as migrants conditionally.

March
10 March - William McMahon replaces John Gorton as Prime Minister of Australia after a party room ballot on a motion of confidence in John Gorton as Prime Minister.  The ballot was divided 33:33 until Mr. Gorton, as chairman, gave his casting vote against the motion, effectively voting himself out of office.  He stood for and won the position of Deputy Party Leader, after William McMahon beat Billy Snedden for the leadership.  Later, John Gorton publishes an article critical of Cabinet leaks.

July
24 July - Queensland Premier Joh Bjelke-Petersen declares a State of Emergency to allow the touring South African Springboks football team to play.

October
13 October - Enrolment, but not voting, is made compulsory for Aborigines and Torres Strait Islanders in Queensland.

November
2 November - 
President Richard Nixon gives Prime Minister William McMahon an unqualified endorsement of the Anzus alliance, saying that the United States would honour its commitments under the alliance, which he described as one of America's fundamental pillars in the Pacific.
Sonia McMahon, wife of Prime Minister William McMahon, captures international attention when she wears a daring full-length dress, with a long slit down the sides revealing her legs, to a White House reception.  The dress was designed by South Yarra fashion designer Victoria Ciscijo of Valencia House.  Sonia McMahon would be most remembered in years to come for this dress.

December
24 December – Cyclone Althea hits Townsville and surrounding islands, killing 3
 Australia and New Zealand announce pullout of troops from Vietnam

Date unknown
Plumbers and Gasfitters Employees Union Building, construction in Melbourne is completed.

Arts and literature

 David Williamson writes The Removalists
 David Ireland's novel The Unknown Industrial Prisoner wins the Miles Franklin Award

Film
 Walkabout
 Wake in Fright

Television
 4 January – American children's educational TV series Sesame Street premieres on ABC.
 28 July – Pick-A-Box, hosted by Bob and Dolly Dyer, airs for the final time. It had first been broadcast as a radio program in 1948.

Sport
18 September – South Sydney defeated St. George 16–10 in the NSWRL Grand Final at the Sydney Cricket Ground; thus winning four premierships in five years and their 20th overall. It would become their final premiership win until 2014.
25 September – Hawthorn defeated St. Kilda 12.10 (82) to 11.9 (75) in the VFL Grand Final at the Melbourne Cricket Ground; thus winning their second senior premiership.
25 September – Derek Clayton wins his third men's national marathon title, clocking 2:11:08.8 in Hobart.
 Silver Knight wins the Melbourne Cup
 South Australia wins the Sheffield Shield
 Kialoa takes line honours in the Sydney to Hobart Yacht Race. Pathfinder takes handicap honours
 1971 Springbok tour

Births
 17 January – Peter Winter, track and field decathlete
 25 January – Brett Aitken, track cyclist
 26 January – Lee Naylor, track and field athlete
 14 February – Lisa-Marie Vizaniari, discus thrower
 19 February
Lisa McCune, actress and singer
Richard Green, golfer
 20 March – Murray Bartlett, actor
 26 March – Rennae Stubbs, tennis player
 1 April – Lachy Hulme, actor and screenwriter
 2 April – Todd Woodbridge, tennis player
 20 April 
John Senden, golfer
Grant Smith, field hockey player
 1 May – Stuart Appleby, golfer
 4 May – Miles Stewart, triathlete
 7 May – Billy Moore, Australian rugby league player
 17 May
Mark Connors, rugby union player
Shaun Hart, footballer, coach, and sportscaster
 27 May – Wayne Carey, Australian rules footballer
 3 June – Mary Grigson, cyclist
 21 June 
 Jason Costigan, politician and rugby league commentator.
 Kyle Sandilands, DJ, Australian Idol judge and TV presenter
 3 July - Julian Assange, activist
 12 July – Robert Allenby, golfer
 28 August – Daniel Goddard, actor and model
 2 September – Gregory Corbitt, field hockey striker
 18 September
 Kate Starre, field hockey midfielder
 Kevin Campion, rugby league player
 1 October – Andrew O'Keefe, highest-rating television personality
 20 October – Dannii Minogue, singer, actress and television personality
 29 October – Matthew Hayden, cricket player
 10 November - Monique Allen, gymnast
 14 November
 Adam Gilchrist, cricket player
 John Barilaro, politician, 18th Deputy Premier of New South Wales
 19 November – Michelle Andrews, field hockey midfielder
 6 December – Brendan Garard, field hockey player
 date unknown – Janine Deakin, geneticist

Deaths
 27 May – Chips Rafferty (b. 1909), actor
 30 July – Kenneth Slessor (b. 1901), poet
 19 August – Jack Emanuel (b. 1918), George Cross recipient
 16 October – Robin Boyd (b. 1919), architect

References

 
Australia
Years of the 20th century in Australia